William Richardson Belknap (March 28, 1849 – June 2, 1914), for 28 years was president of the Belknap Hardware and Manufacturing Company based in Louisville, Kentucky, one of the largest hardware American manufacturing companies and wholesale hardware companies of its time.

Early life
William Richardson Belknap was born in Louisville on March 28, 1849 to William Burke Belknap and Mary Richardson. His younger brother was Morris B. Belknap. He graduated from Yale's Sheffield Scientific School in 1869, and in 1873 he spent a year traveling in Europe with his younger brother Morris.

Career
In 1880, following the death of his father, founder of the Belknap company, he became its president. After his retirement as president of Belknap Hardware, he became the company's Chairman of the Board.

Belknap was a member of the American Society of Civil Engineers. The William R. Belknap School in the Belknap neighborhood of Louisville was named for him. He was a charter member of the Salmagundi Club and served for three years as its secretary. He was a trustee of Berea College, and the namesake and founder of the William R. Belknap Prizes awarded for excellence in the fields of geology and biology in Yale's Sheffield Scientific School.

Personal life

In 1874, Belknap married Alice Trumbull Silliman (1846–1890), the daughter of Benjamin Silliman Jr., a professor of chemistry at Yale University who was instrumental in developing the oil industry. They had a son, William Burke Belknap, and four daughters; the eldest, Eleanor, married Kentucky newspaper editor Lewis Craig Humphrey; the second, Alice, married the physician and surgeon Forbes Hawkes.

After his wife's death in 1890, he married Juliet Rathbone Davison (1862–1948) in 1894.

Belknap died on June 2, 1914 in Jefferson County, Kentucky.  At his death in 1914, and after building Lincliff in 1911, his estate was estimated at $3,000,000 to $5,000,000. He is buried in the Belknap family plot at Cave Hill Cemetery, Louisville.

Residences
In 1911, Belknap built his house, Lincliff. The Olmsted Brothers were hired by Belknap to create plans for the estate grounds. Lincliff was added to the National Register of Historic Places in 1983. Lincliff is currently owned by Stephen F. Humphrey, widower of the mystery writer the late Sue Grafton. Together they worked on restoration of the building and grounds.

References

Further reading
 
 Yale University. Sheffield Scientific School. Biographical Record, Classes from Eighteen Hundred and Sixty-eight to Eighteen Hundred and Seventy-two of the Sheffield Scientific School. Class secretaries bureau, Yale university, 1910.
 E. Polk Johnson, A History of Kentucky and Kentuckians: The Leaders and Representative Men in Commerce, Industry and Modern Activities, (1912).

External links

1849 births
1914 deaths
Yale School of Engineering & Applied Science alumni
Burials at Cave Hill Cemetery
Businesspeople from Louisville, Kentucky
Berea College people
American industrialists
Members of the Salmagundi Club
19th-century American businesspeople